Na Kian is a tambon (subdistrict) of Omkoi District, in Chiang Mai Province, Thailand. In 2017 it had a population of 10,695 people.

History
The subdistrict was created effective 1 July 1990 by splitting off 11 administrative villages from Omkoi.

Administration

Central administration
The tambon is divided into 21 administrative villages (mubans).

Local administration
The area of the subdistrict is covered by the subdistrict administrative organization (SAO) Na Kian (องค์การบริหารส่วนตำบลนาเกียน).

References

External links
Thaitambon.com on Na Kian

Tambon of Chiang Mai province
Populated places in Chiang Mai province